Altai, until 2019 known as Zyryan (Zyrian) or Zyryanovsk is a town of regional significance in East Kazakhstan Region of Kazakhstan, the administrative center of Zyryan District.  It was established in 1791 and was granted town status in 1941. Population:

Location 

Zyryanovsk is located in the Rudnyi Altai, on the banks of the Berezovka River, a left tributary of the Bukhtarma. A 183-km railroad connects Zyrianovsk with Ust-Kamenogorsk. Also through Zyryanovsk there passes a highways Ust-Kamenogorsk – Rakhmanovskie Kluchi and Ust-Kamenogorsk – Bolshenarymskoe.

Industry 
Zyrianovsk owed its establishment to the exploitation of a complex-ore deposit, discovered in 1791 by a local inhabitant, G. G. Zyrianov. Zyrianovsk has a lead combinat (division "Kazzinc"). The combine is educated from two mines (Maleevsky and Grekhovsky), concentrating factory, non-productive departments.

Education 
In the city the center of the East Kazakhstan state technical university, and also medical college, agrarian and technical college, humanitarian college, construction and transport college, industrial college functions.
There are 8 schools, 3 kindergartens, 3 public libraries, Palace of culture, equipment and sports, the Equipments-House.

Notable residents
 Alfred Koch (born 1961) – Russian writer, mathematician-economist, and businessman
 Alexander Rosenbaum (born 1951) – Soviet and Russian bard

References

Populated places in East Kazakhstan Region
Tomsk Governorate
Populated places established in 1791